List of communities in Colchester County, Nova Scotia.

This list is ordered by the highway upon which they are located.  All routes start with the terminus located near the largest community.

Trunk routes

Trunk 2: Stewiacke - Alton – Brentwood - Brookfield - Hilden – Truro - Onslow - Masstown - Glenholme - Little Dyke - Great Village - Highland Village - Portapique - Five Houses - Bass River - Upper Economy - Cove Road - Economy – Carrs Brook  - Lower Economy - Five Islands
Trunk 4: Folly Lake – Masstown – Onslow – Truro – Bible Hill - Kemptown
Trunk 6: Bayhead - Tatamagouche - Brule

Arterial highways

Highway 102: Truro Heights, Lower Truro

Collector roads

Route 224: Gays River
Route 236: Green Oaks - Beaver Brook - Old Barns – Truro Heights
Route 246: Tatamagouche - Oliver - West New Annan
Route 256: West New Annan - Central New Annan - The Falls - Balmoral Mills - East Earltown
Route 289: Green Oaks - Green Creek – Brookfield - Earltown - Otter Brook - Upper Stewiacke – Eastville
Route 311: Bible Hill - North River - Nuttby - Earltown
Route 326: Earltown - North Earltown – East Earltown - Denmark – Brule
Route 336: Newton Mills – Eastville

Communities located on rural roads

Acadian Mines
Belmont
Black Rock
Burnside
Camden
Castlereagh
Cloverdale
Coldstream
Debert
East Mines Station
East Stewiacke 
East Village
French River
Greenfield
Harmony
Lanesville
Little Dyke
Londonderry
Lornevale
Lynn
McCallum Settlement
Montrose
Pleasant Hills
Princeport
Riversdale
Salmon River
Sand Point
South Branch
Union
Valley
West St. Andrews
Wittenburg

See also

Colchester County, Nova Scotia

Geography of Colchester County